Mohemmat sazi Football Club was Iranian football club based in Tehran, Iran. They play in the 2nd Division.

Football clubs in Tehran